McNee or Macnee is a surname. Notable people with the surname include:

Chris McNee 1914–1986), Scottish footballer 
Daniel Macnee (1806–1882) Scottish painter
David McNee (born 1925) former commissioner of the Metropolitan Police and Chief Constable of City of Glasgow Police
Dorothea Macnee (1896–1984) British socialite and mother of Patrick Macnee
Gerry McNee, Scottish football journalist
John McNee (diplomat) (born 1951) Canadian diplomat
Jack McNee, Scottish footballer in the late 19th and early 20th century
Lorna McNee, Scottish chef
Mark McNee (born 1981) Australian short track speed skater
Patrick Macnee (1922–2015) British-American actor
Robert McNee (1923-1992) U.S. Professor of Geography. University of Cincinnati

See also
McNee Ranch State Park